Neolissochilus is a genus of fish in the family Cyprinidae native to freshwater habitats in Asia that are often grouped with the mahseers.

Species
There are currently 29 recognized species in this genus:

 Neolissochilus acutirostris (Arunachalam, Sivakumar & Murugan, 2017)
 Neolissochilus baoshanensis (X. Y. Chen & J. X. Yang, 1999)
 Neolissochilus benasi (Pellegrin & Chevey, 1936)
 Neolissochilus blanci (Pellegrin & P. W. Fang, 1940)
 Neolissochilus blythii (F. Day, 1870)
 Neolissochilus capudelphinus (Arunachalam, Sivakumar & Murugan, 2017)
 Neolissochilus compressus (F. Day, 1870)
 Neolissochilus dukai (F. Day, 1878)
 Neolissochilus hendersoni (Herre, 1940)
 Neolissochilus heterostomus (X. Y. Chen & J. X. Yang, 1999)
 Neolissochilus hexagonolepis (McClelland, 1839) – copper mahseer
 Neolissochilus hexastichus (McClelland, 1839)
 Neolissochilus longipinnis (M. C. W. Weber & de Beaufort, 1916)
 Neolissochilus micropthalmus (Arunachalam, Sivakumar & Murugan, 2017)
 Neolissochilus minimus (Arunachalam, Sivakumar & Murugan, 2017)
 Neolissochilus nigrovittatus (Boulenger, 1893)
 Neolissochilus paucisquamatus (H. M. Smith, 1945)
 Neolissochilus pnar (Dahanukar, Sundar, Rangad, Proudlove & Raghavan, 2023)
 Neolissochilus soro (Valenciennes, 1842)
 Neolissochilus soroides (Duncker, 1904) — Soro brook carp
 Neolissochilus spinulosus (McClelland, 1845)
 Neolissochilus stevensonii (F. Day, 1870)
 Neolissochilus stracheyi (F. Day, 1871)
 Neolissochilus subterraneus (Vidthayanon & Kottelat, 2003)
 Neolissochilus sumatranus (M. C. W. Weber & de Beaufort, 1916)
 Neolissochilus tamiraparaniensis (Arunachalam, Sivakumar & Murugan, 2017)
 Neolissochilus thienemanni (C. G. E. Ahl, 1933)
 Neolissochilus vittatus (H. M. Smith, 1945)
 Neolissochilus wynaadensis (F. Day, 1873)

References

Cyprinid fish of Asia
Freshwater fish genera
Cyprinidae genera
Taxonomy articles created by Polbot